The 2018 season was the New Orleans Saints' 52nd in the National Football League (NFL), their 43rd at the Mercedes-Benz Superdome and their 12th under head coach Sean Payton.

This season was the first since 1984 without owner Tom Benson, who died in March. In Week 11, the Saints defeated the Philadelphia Eagles to reach their first nine-game winning streak since their Super Bowl winning season in 2009, ensuring they clinched their second consecutive winning season for the first time since 2010–2011. They swept their division rivals, the Atlanta Falcons, after a 31–17 victory on Thanksgiving night for the first time since 2015 while extending their second longest winning streak in franchise history to 10 games, which came to an end when the Saints lost to the Dallas Cowboys 13–10, on November 29. On December 9, the Saints clinched their second straight NFC South division championship when they defeated the Tampa Bay Buccaneers, their first back-to-back division titles in franchise history. On December 17, after beating the Carolina Panthers, the Saints improved on their 11–5 record from 2017. After a Week 16 win over the Pittsburgh Steelers, the Saints clinched home field advantage throughout the playoffs for the first time since 2009. The Saints finished the season with a 13–3 record, tied for the most wins in a season in franchise history.

In the playoffs, the Saints defeated the defending Super Bowl champion Philadelphia Eagles 20–14 in the Divisional Round. However, the Saints' season came to an end in a 26–23 overtime loss to the Los Angeles Rams in the NFC Championship Game in controversial fashion, which ended their hopes of returning to the Super Bowl for the first time since Super Bowl XLIV. Additionally, it marked the first time since 1992 that the Saints lost a postseason game at home.

Draft

Notes
 The Saints traded their 2018 first-round selection (27th overall), along with their 2019 first-round selection to the Green Bay Packers in exchange for the 14th overall selection.
 The Saints received a 2018 sixth-round selection (189th overall) from the Arizona Cardinals in exchange for running back Adrian Peterson.

Staff

Final roster

Preseason

Regular season

Schedule
The Saints' 2018 schedule was released on April 19.

Note: Intra-division opponents are in bold text.

Game summaries

Week 1: vs. Tampa Bay Buccaneers
With the loss to the Buccaneers, the Saints started their season off with 0-1.

Week 2: vs. Cleveland Browns
With the win against the Browns, they improved to 1-1.

Week 3: at Atlanta Falcons
In this game, both teams tied in the 4th quarter, resulting in a Saints victory against the Falcons in overtime. They improved to 2-1.

Week 4: at New York Giants
The Saints played at the Giants for the first time since 2016. In the 1st quarter, they trailed by 7, but for the remainder of the game, they were able to make a comeback against them. Therefore, they won this game and brought their record to 3-1.

Week 5: vs. Washington Redskins

This game was one year removed from last season, where the Saints overcame a 15-point deficit against the Redskins at home with three minutes remaining. This time, the Saints dominated the entire game. This game marked Drew Brees passing Brett Favre and Peyton Manning on most passing yards. The win improved the Saints to 4-1.

Week 7: at Baltimore Ravens

Drew Brees would throw his 500th touchdown pass against Baltimore and becoming the third quarterback in modern NFL history to defeat all 32 teams playing in the 2018 season – after Peyton Manning and Brett Favre. In doing so, he improved his record against the Ravens to 1-4. This also marked the Saints' one point victory over the Ravens, since Justin Tucker missed the extra point which was a nod to John Carney's missed PAT in a 2003 matchup against the Jacksonville Jaguars.

Week 8: at Minnesota Vikings

The Saints travelled to Minnesota for the first time since the 2017 Divisional round; during which safety Marcus Williams missed a tackle on the game's final play that allowed a 61-yard game-winning touchdown reception by Stefon Diggs. In this divisional round rematch, despite a good offensive showing from Kirk Cousins and Stefon Diggs, and Drew Brees who was held to just 120 passing yards, New Orleans still won the game 30-20 to go to 6-1 and avenge their aforementioned playoff loss.

Week 9: vs. Los Angeles Rams
With the victory, the Saints extended their winning streak to 7 games (Starting from week 2) and ended the previously 8-0 Rams' chances at completing a perfect season. Also, star wide receiver Michael Thomas, after scoring on his 12th reception, paid homage to former Saints wide receiver Joe Horn by pulling out a cell phone from underneath the goalpost pretending to make a call. This celebration drew a 15-yard unsportsmanlike conduct penalty. This was also the final victory over the Rams, who eventually beat them in the playoffs and one season after that.

Week 10: at Cincinnati Bengals

After losing the newly acquired Dez Bryant for the year with an Achilles' tear in practice, several players, including Michael Thomas, and running backs Mark Ingram II and Alvin Kamara paid tribute by throwing up Bryant's signature 'X' celebration each time they scored. Safety Marcus Williams returned a long interception to end the first half with the Saints leading 35-7. New Orleans would eventually stun the Bengals in a 51-14 victory and their streak continued, going 8-1. It was also the first time since the 2010 season in which the Saints defeated the Bengals.

Week 11: vs. Philadelphia Eagles

After head coach Sean Payton lost a golf bet to Eagles head coach Doug Pederson, the Saints, despite being the home team, wore their white color rush uniforms. It was the first time the Saints used the uniforms at home. They were able to beat the Eagles by 41 points, despite Philadelphia being the defending Super Bowl champions from last season. This brought the Saints record to 9-1.

Week 12: vs. Atlanta Falcons
NFL on Thanksgiving Day
The Saints were able to beat the Falcons 31-17 on a Thanksgiving Game. This not only improved their record to 10-1, it also marked the first season since 2015 to sweep the Falcons.

Week 13: at Dallas Cowboys
Michael Thomas recorded his 90th catch of the season, joining Odell Beckham Jr. as the only players in NFL history to record at least 90 receptions in their first three seasons. However, Drew Brees would lose the game for the Saints by throwing an interception to Jourdan Lewis, thus snapping the Saints' 10-game win streak and dropping them to 10–2.

Week 14: at Tampa Bay Buccaneers
The New Orleans Saints trailed the Tampa Bay Buccaneers 14-3 halfway through the 3rd quarter when Taysom Hill sparked a rally by blocking a punt and setting up New Orleans inside Tampa Bay territory. The Saints would go on to win in a comeback 28-14 and clinching a playoff berth in the process. Their record improves to 11-2 with the victory over the Buccaneers.

Week 15: at Carolina Panthers
The Saints travel to Bank of America Stadium to play against the Panthers. During the punt, Thomas Morstead was tripped up by the defender, prompting the Saints to get a free first down from the Roughing the Kicker penalty. The Saints win by 3 points and improve their record to 12-2.

Week 16: vs. Pittsburgh Steelers

With the win, the Saints clinched home field advantage throughout the NFC playoffs. Mark Ingram II recorded his 50th touchdown, surpassing Deuce McAllister for the Saints franchise record for rushing touchdowns. The Saints were the only NFC South team to defeat all four of their AFC North opponents in 2018. They improve to 13-2 in the process.

Week 17: vs. Carolina Panthers

Teddy Bridgewater started in this game. With the loss, the Saints finish the season 13-3. With the first-round bye, the Saints secured their spot in the playoffs.

Standings

Division

Conference

Single player milestone
Late in the first half of the Week 5, Monday Night game against the Washington Redskins, Quarterback Drew Brees surpassed Brett Favre (71,838) and Peyton Manning (71,940) for the most career passing yards. Brees surpassed Favre on a 2-yard touchdown pass to tight end Josh Hill, and later he surpassed Manning with a 62-yard touchdown pass to rookie wide receiver Tre'Quan Smith, giving him the NFL's All-Time Career pass yardage record. Brees also threw his 500th touchdown pass against the Baltimore Ravens, with a 1-yard touchdown pass to tight end Benjamin Watson.

Postseason

NFC Divisional Playoffs: vs. (6) Philadelphia Eagles
The Saints host the Philadelphia Eagles in the playoffs for the first time since the 2006 season, the first since the 2013 season to play the Eagles under Nick Foles. The Saints initially trailed by 14 points but made a comeback in the end. Marshon Lattimore stuns the Eagles with an interception to secure the Saints' victory and advance to the NFC Championship. Their record improves to 14-3.

NFC Championship: vs. (2) Los Angeles Rams

Coming off with the Divisional Round victory over the Eagles, the Saints remain in the Superdome to host the Los Angeles Rams. It was the first time since January 24, 2010, the Saints host the NFC Championship in their home field.

The game was marred with controversy after the referees missed a pass interference call of Nickell Robey-Coleman's hit on Tommylee Lewis on 3rd-and-10 with 1:45 remaining in the 4th quarter.
Some fans, players, and analysts believe the missed call is among the worst in NFL history.
The NFL admitted to missing the call soon after the game was over, but did not apologize for the situation until a week and a half later. The fallout from the missed call was a factor in the NFL's decision to expand instant replay, making pass interference (including non-calls) reviewable.

With the controversial loss in overtime, the Saints finish their season 14-4.

References

External links
 

New Orleans
New Orleans Saints seasons
NFC South championship seasons
New Orleans Saints